Yulianna Ihorivna Tunytska (born 7 August 2003 in Kremenets, Ukraine) is a Ukrainian luger.

Career
Tunytska debuted in the World Cup during the 2018-19 season when she finished 23rd in Königssee. As of February 2022, her best individual Luge World Cup finish was 15th during the 2020–21 in Sigulda, Latvia.

Tunytska competed at the 2020 Winter Youth Olympics in Lausanne, Switzerland, where she was 5th in the singles competition and 6th in the team relay (together with Pylypiv, Mykyievych, and Babura).

In 2022, Yulianna Tunytska was nominated for her first Winter Games in Beijing.

Career results

Winter Olympics

World Championships

European Championships

Luge World Cup

Rankings

References

External links
 
 
 

2003 births
Living people
Ukrainian female lugers
Olympic lugers of Ukraine
Lugers at the 2020 Winter Youth Olympics
Lugers at the 2022 Winter Olympics
People from Kremenets
Sportspeople from Ternopil Oblast
21st-century Ukrainian women